Shahram Shiva is an author, writer, poet, recording artist and translator of the works of Rumi, a 13th-century Persian poet and philosopher.

Shahram Shiva was born in Persia and migrated to the US at a young age. He began translating Rumi's poetry in 1988 in New York City. Since 2009 Shahram Shiva has expanded his repertoire to include new original lyrics and songs. Shahram Shiva is the founder of Rumi Network. 

He has written numerous articles for The Huffington Post and other publications.

Shahram Shiva taught Robert Downey Jr. the whirling movement in the movie Game 6 directed by Michael Hoffman (director).

Performances
Since 1992, Shahram Shiva has been presenting concerts and readings at numerous venues, including the United Nations, the Smithsonian Institution, Museum of Contemporary Art San Diego, Cathedral of St. John the Divine, Joyce Theater, Kripalu Center, Omega Institute for Holistic Studies, New York Open Center, Yale University, Columbia University, and New York University, among many others.

From April 25 to May 5, 1998, Shiva performed in his own opera, Until the Next Whirl, at La MaMa Experimental Theatre Club in the Lower East Side of Manhattan.

Bibliography
Rumi: The Beloved is YouMy Favorite Collection of Deeply Passionate, Whimsical, Spiritual and Profound Poems and Quotes. Rumi Network. (2022)
12 Secret Laws of Self-Realization: A Guide to Enlightenment and Ascension by a Modern Mystic. Rumi Network. (2020)
Rumi's Untold Story: From 30-Year Research. Rumi Network. (2018)
Transformative Whirling: Shahram Shiva's Unique & Proven 4-Step Method to Whirling. Rumi Network. (2018)
Rumi, Thief of Sleep: Quatrains from the Persian. Foreword by Deepak Chopra. Hohm Press. (2000)
Hush, Don't Say Anything to God: Passionate Poems of Rumi. Jain Publishing. (1999)
Rending the Veil: Literal and Poetic Translations of Rumi. Hohm Press. (Recipient of a Benjamin Franklin Award) (1995)
A Garden Beyond Paradise: The Mystical Poetry of Rumi. Bantam Books (Random House) (1992).

Discography
Love Evolve, a collection of 10 songs.  A mix of Rumi poetry set to music, and original songs with lyrics by Shahram Shiva. Produced by the GRAMMY Award-winner Danny Blume and Shahram Shiva. (2012)
Rumi: Lovedrunk (Remastered), 2012 Release.  A remastered release with enhanced sound and new cover design.  A collection of 10 songs with lyrics based on Rumi poems, as translated and interpreted by Shahram Shiva. Produced by Olivier Glissant and Shahram Shiva. (2012)
Rumi: Lovedrunk, a collection of 10 songs with lyrics based on Rumi poems, as translated and interpreted by Shahram Shiva. Produced by Olivier Glissant and Shahram Shiva. (2005)

References

20th-century translators
American people of Iranian-Jewish descent
Iranian Jews
American translators
Living people
Persian–English translators
Rumi scholars
American writers of Iranian descent
Year of birth missing (living people)